Tabal (c.f. biblical Tubal; Assyrian: 𒋫𒁄) was a Luwian speaking Neo-Hittite kingdom (and/or collection of kingdoms) of South Central Anatolia during the Iron Age. According to archaeologist Kurt Bittel, references to Tabal first appeared after the collapse of the Hittite Empire. Tabal was likely an exonym applied by the Assyrians to Cappadocia.  While its native name is uncertain, it is possible that it was called Sura, as mentioned in the records of Yariri, ruler of Carchemish.

Originally, Tabal was likely the name of a region or collection of kingdoms. However, Tabal may have later consolidated into a single kingdom, perhaps annexing, or being annexed by, the neighboring kingdom of Melid.

According to Lorenzo D'alfonso, the Tabalians may have, at least partially, descended from the Nairi tribe Tuali.

The Assyrian king Shalmaneser III records that he received gifts from their 24 kings in 837 BC and the following year. A century later, their king Burutash is mentioned in an inscription of king Tiglath-Pileser III. The kings of Tabal have left a number of inscriptions from the 9th-8th centuries BC in hieroglyphic-Luwian in the Turkish villages of Çalapverdi and Alişar.

During the reign of Sargon II, Tabal entered in an alliance with the Mushki and Carchemish to counter Assyria.

Toward the end of the 8th century BC, Tabal was at least partially conquered by Assyria.

In 640 BC, inspired by the Cimmerians, the Tabalian king Mugallu rebelled against Ashurbanipal. However, Mugallu was defeated.

Some have attempted to link Tabal to the tribe of the Tibareni (Tibarenoi in Greek, Thobeles in Josephus) who lived near the Black Sea. According to Toumanoff, the Tabal(Tubal, Tibal, Tibar) were proto-Georgians(Kartvelians) who later migrated with the Mushki north to the Pontic region, which contributed to the formation of the eastern Georgian Kingdom of Iberia and the ancient Greeks also referred to them as the Tibareni and Moschi. The Tibareni are mentioned in the works of Hecataeus of Miletus, Herodotus, Xenophon, Strabo, and Apollonius of Rhodes, who stated they were Scythians. On this ground, the Georgian historian Ivane Javakhishvili (1950) considered Tabal, Tubal, Jabal and Jubal to be an early Kartvelian tribal designation.

The known rulers of Tabal are:

 Tuwati I (Assyrian Tuatti), c. 837 BC
 Kikki, son of  Tuwati I, c. 837 BC
 Tuwati II, mid 8th century BC
 Wasusarma (Assyrian Wassurme), son of Tuwati II, c. 740 - 730 BC
 Hulli, 730 - 726 BC
 Ambaris, son of Hulli, c. 721 - 713 BC
Hidi c. 690 BC
 Iškallu c. 679 BC
 Mugallu/Mukalli c. 670, 663, 651 BC
x-ussi, son of Mugallu (ca. 650/640 BC)

Bibliography

 Ivane Javakhishvili. Historical-Ethnological problems of Georgia, the Caucasus and the Near East. Tbilisi, 1950, pp. 130–135 (in Georgian)
 Simon Janashia. Works, vol. III. Tbilisi, 1959, pp. 2–74 (in Georgian)
 Nana Khazaradze. The Ethnopolitical entities of Eastern Asia Minor in the first half of the 1st millennium BC. Tbilisi, 1978, pp. 3–139 (in Georgian, Russian and English)

References

See also
Ancient regions of Anatolia

Tabal
Anatolia
Ancient history of Georgia (country)
Syro-Hittite states